The International Association for Greek Philosophy (IAGP) is an international philosophical society whose purpose is to promote the study of Greek philosophy. The IAGP is a member of the International Federation of Philosophical Societies. It is the only international association for philosophy located in Greece.

Events 
The association has sponsored 22 annual conferences on Greek philosophy, including the first World Olympic Congress on Philosophy in 2004.

Membership 

The association provides for membership of individuals and organizations. The individual members consist of many Greek teachers, scholars of the Greek Diaspora and leading foreign professors, experts on Greek philosophy and culture from many parts of the world.

The IAGP has several affiliated organizations including, the South African Society for Greek Philosophy and the Humanities (SASGPH), the Albanian Society of Greek Philosophy and Culture, and the Serbian Society of Greek Philosophy.

Publications 
The association has published numerous books in cooperation with the International Center for Greek Philosophy and Culture (ICGPC) under the title "Ionia Publications".

External links 
Official website

Philosophical societies
Learned societies of Greece
International learned societies